The Lotus 3-Eleven is a sports car produced by British car manufacturer Lotus Cars. The car is available as a racing version as well as a normal road legal version.

Unveiled at the Goodwood Festival of Speed in 2015, it was launched in 2016 at a price of 82,500 for the road version (plus VAT) (116,500 (including VAT) for the race version) and limited to a production run of 311 units worldwide.

The upgraded car is known as the 3-Eleven 430.

Specifications and performance

The 3-Eleven is available in two configurations; a road legal version and a race version. The car has a mid-mounted engine configuration and comes with a  Toyota 2GR-FE V6 engine coupled with an Edelbrock Roots-type supercharger. Both versions of the car have different transmissions; a 6-speed manual transmission is available for the road version and a paddle operated 6-speed sequential manual transmission is available for the race version.

References

External links 

Lotus' official web page

3-Eleven
Cars introduced in 2016
2010s cars